Mignon is an 1866 opera by Ambroise Thomas, based on Goethe's Wilhelm Meister's Apprenticeship.

Mignon (French for "cute" or "kind") may also refer to:

Arts and entertainment 
 Mignon, a fictional character in Goethe's novels Wilhelm Meister's Apprenticeship and Wilhelm Meister's Journeyman Years
 Mignon (Schubert), the Goethe character and the subject of several lieder by Schubert
 the title character of Modeste Mignon, an 1844 novel by Honoré de Balzac
 Mignon, a 1962 novel by James M. Cain
 Mignon (1915 film), an American film based on the opera
 Mignon (1922 film), a German film based on Wilhelm Meister's Apprenticeship
 the title character of Mignon Has Come to Stay, a 1988 Italian film

Places 
 Mignon, Alabama, a census-designated place in the United States
 Canal du Mignon, a canal in western France
 Mignon (river), a tributary of the Sèvre Niortaise in Deux-Sèvres, Poitou, France
 Mignon Point, a headland on the south side of the entrance to Belize Inlet, British Columbia, Canada

People
 Mignon (name), a list of people with the given name or surname
 Mignon (musician), German punk-rock musician
 Les Mignons, a term for the frivolous and fashionable young men who were favorites of King Henry III of France

Other uses 
 Mignon (chocolate egg), a confectionery product made by Fazer
 Mignon, a quality of the French Maroilles cheese
 Mignon battery, a common European term for an AA battery
 Rosa 'Cécile Brünner', a rose also known as Mignon

See also
 Filet mignon, a tender cut of beef
 Welte-Mignon, a former manufacturer of orchestrions, organs and reproducing pianos
 Minion (disambiguation)
 Mignonne (disambiguation)